Brigadier General James Campbell Robertson,  (24 October 1878 – 22 January 1951) was an Australian stockbroker and a senior officer in the Australian Army during the First World War.

References

1878 births
1951 deaths
Military personnel from Queensland
Australian Companions of the Distinguished Service Order
Australian Companions of the Order of St Michael and St George
Australian Companions of the Order of the Bath
Australian generals
Australian military personnel of World War I
Australian stockbrokers
People from Toowoomba